Halle Olympique is an indoor arena located in Albertville, France. For the 1992 Winter Olympics, it hosted the figure skating and the short track speed skating events. It was first use for the 1991 Trophée Lalique, which was staged as a test event for the Olympics. The venue also hosted selected matches of the 2017 World Men's Handball Championship.

The site was constructed on ten internal pillars. Its ice was laid down on  foundation, then  of insulation,  of screed, and finally,  of ice. The ice temperature was kept between  depending upon the sporting discipline. The Halle Olympique underwent a major overhaul in 2014 and was reopened the following spring.

In fiction

In the film, I, Tonya, the scenes which take place in La halle de glace Olympique have not been shot in Albertville, but in the Macon Coliseum in Georgia.

References
1992 Winter Olympics official report. pp. 83, 87.
Official website 

Specific

Venues of the 1992 Winter Olympics
Olympic figure skating venues
Olympic short track speed skating venues
Indoor arenas in France
Sports venues in Savoie
Sports venues completed in 1991